Miletus croton is a butterfly in the family Lycaenidae. It is found in Asia.

Subspecies
 Miletus croton croton (Burma)
 Miletus croton corus Eliot, 1961 (southern Shan States, north-western Thailand)
 Miletus croton karennia Evans, 1932 (Karen Hills)

References

Butterflies described in 1889
Miletus (butterfly)
Butterflies of Asia